Elmer Glenn Myers (March 2, 1894; York Springs, Pennsylvania – July 29, 1976; Collingswood, New Jersey) was a professional baseball player who played in the Major Leagues primarily as a pitcher from 1915 to 1922.

External links

1894 births
1976 deaths
People from Adams County, Pennsylvania
People from Collingswood, New Jersey
Philadelphia Athletics players
Cleveland Indians players
Boston Red Sox players
Major League Baseball pitchers
Baseball players from Pennsylvania
Raleigh Capitals players
Salt Lake City Bees players
Los Angeles Angels (minor league) players
Knoxville Smokies players
Columbus Senators players